Øyvind Korsberg (born 31 January 1960 in Tromsø) is a Norwegian politician for the Progress Party. He was First Vice President of the Storting during the term 2009–2013.

He was elected to the Norwegian Parliament from Troms in 1997, and has been re-elected on two occasions.

Korsberg was a member of the executive committee of Tromsø city council during the term 1991–1995.

References

1960 births
Living people
Progress Party (Norway) politicians
Members of the Storting
Politicians from Tromsø
Vice Presidents of the Storting
21st-century Norwegian politicians
20th-century Norwegian politicians